The Tahoma Vista Comfort Station was designed by the National Park Service Branch of Plans and Designs in the National Park Service Rustic style and built in Mount Rainier National Park by the Civilian Conservation Corps in 1931. The design was supervised by Park Service Chief Architect Thomas Chalmers Vint, and site selection and development were undertaken by Park Service landscape architect Ernest A. Davidson.  The comfort station serves the Tahoma Vista Overlook, also designed by Davidson. The  by  public toilet facility features rough stonework to window sill level, with a framed wall above and a log-framed roof with cedar shingles.

The Tahoma Vista Comfort Station was placed on the National Register of Historic Places on March 13, 1991. It is part of the Mount Rainier National Historic Landmark District, which encompasses the entire park and which recognizes the park's inventory of Park Service-designed rustic architecture.

References

Park buildings and structures on the National Register of Historic Places in Washington (state)
Infrastructure completed in 1931
Buildings and structures in Pierce County, Washington
Rustic architecture in Washington (state)
Buildings and structures in Mount Rainier National Park
Restrooms in the United States
National Register of Historic Places in Mount Rainier National Park
1931 establishments in Washington (state)